The 2020 Southeast Missouri State Redhawks football team represented Southeast Missouri State University as a member of the Ohio Valley Conference (OVC) during the 2020–21 NCAA Division I FCS football season. Led by seventh-year head coach Tom Matukewicz, the Redhawks compiled an overall record of 4–4 with a mark of 4–3 in conference play, placing fourth in the OVC. Southeast Missouri State played home games at Houck Stadium in Cape Girardeau, Missouri.

Previous season

The Redhawks finished the 2019 season 9–4, 7–1 in OVC play to finish in second place. They received an at-large bid to the FCS Playoffs, where they lost to Illinois State in the first round.

Schedule
Southeast Missouri State released their full schedule on February 24, 2020. The Redhawks football team had games scheduled against Dayton and Ole Miss, which were canceled before the start of the 2020 season.

References

Southeast Missouri State
Southeast Missouri State Redhawks football seasons
Southeast Missouri State Redhawks football